Jardinella is a genus of small freshwater snails, aquatic gastropod mollusks in the family Tateidae.

Species
 Edgbastonia acuminata (Ponder & G. A. Clark, 1990)
 Edgbastonia alanwillsi Ponder, 2008
 Edgbastonia chillagoensis Ponder, W.-H. Zhang, Hallan & Shea, 2019
 Edgbastonia colmani (Ponder & G. A. Clark, 1990)
 Edgbastonia conjuboyensis Ponder, W.-H. Zhang, Hallan & Shea, 2019
 Edgbastonia coreena (Ponder & G. A. Clark, 1990)
 Edgbastonia corrugata (Ponder & G. A. Clark, 1990)
 Edgbastonia edgbastonensis (Ponder & G. A. Clark, 1990)
 Edgbastonia hufferensis Ponder, W.-H. Zhang, Hallan & Shea, 2019
 Edgbastonia jesswisseae (Ponder & G. A. Clark, 1990)
 Edgbastonia pagoda Ponder, W.-H. Zhang, Hallan & Shea, 2019
 Edgbastonia pallida (Ponder & G. A. Clark, 1990)
 Edgbastonia routhensis Ponder, W.-H. Zhang, Hallan & Shea, 2019
 Edgbastonia rugosa Ponder, W.-H. Zhang, Hallan & Shea, 2019
 Edgbastonia zeidlerorum (Ponder & G. A. Clark, 1990)

References

 Ponder, W.F.; Wilke, T.; Zhang, W.-H.; Golding, R.E.; Fukuda, H.; Mason, R.A.B. (2008). Edgbastonia alanwillsi n. gen & n. sp. (Tateinae: Hydrobiidae s.l.: Rissooidea: Caenogastropoda); a snail from an artesian spring group in western Queensland, Australia, convergent with some Asian Amnicolidae. Molluscan Research. 28(2): 89-106

External links
 Ponder W., Zhang W.-H. (Wei-Hong), Hallan A. & Shea M. (2019). New taxa of Tateidae (Caenogastropoda, Truncatelloidea) from springs associated with the Great Artesian Basin and Einasleigh Uplands, Queensland, with the description of two related taxa from eastern coastal drainages. Zootaxa. 4583(1): 1-67

Tateidae